Atya patya or atya-patya is a traditional Indian tag sport played by two sides of nine players. It is more popular in rural areas of India. It is more commonly played in Maharashtra, a western Indian state. Atya patya is described as a "game of feints". The playing area comprises nine trenches, coming out of either side of a central trench; a point is awarded to the attacking team's players for each trench they cross without being tagged out by the defensive players within the trenches. The game ends after 4 innings (scoring turns) of 7 minutes each, with each team having two innings to score. It has been described as a game of "militant chase". The sport is played in a relatively small area and requires no equipment, similar to other games indigenous to India such as kabaddi, seven stones, kho kho, gillidanda and langdi.

The national governed body of the sport is the "Atya Patya Federation of India". The federation was formed in 1982. The ministry of Youth Affairs and Sports, government of India, lists the federation amongst its list of recognised federation for the year 2013. The federation is headquartered in Nagpur. Its president is H. B. Hallad.

The first south Asian Atya patya Championship was held in Bhutan in June, 2013. It was won by India.

Names and variations 
Some of the alternative names for atya-patya are Killithattu/Klithatu (in Tamil Nadu), Kili Thadthu (in Sri Lanka), Sur-pati, Lon-pati, Darya-banth, saragari, saramani, tilli, uppinat, uppupatti, choupal pati, panchwati, and chikka. A related Bengali game is Dari Bandha/Dariabandha, in which the attacking team is considered to be "stealing salt" by making it up the court and then "taking the salt back" to the start of the court.

In other parts of the world, similar games can be found, such as Galah Panjang/Toi/Tui/Belon Acah in Malaysia.

History 
Atya-patya was mentioned in the Naṟṟiṇai, which was written before 300 AD.

Rules

Field 
The playing field is a rectangular court, with a central lane or "trench" 89 feet and 1 inch (27.15 m) long marked lengthwise down the middle of the court.

Gameplay 
The game is played in four innings (turns), with each inning lasting for seven minutes, and the teams alternating attacking and defending roles in each inning. Before each inning, the defensive team places one player in each of the trenches. A batch of four players on the attacking team, who are referred to as "assailants", line up at one end of the court, in the area in front of the front trench. The goal of the assailants is to score by crossing each trench without being eliminated; the total number of points scored in an inning by the attacking team is equal to the number of trenches crossed by their furthest-advancing assailant. If an assailant is touched by a defender (and the defender commits no faults, such as stepping out of their trench, or lifting a foot at or immediately after the time of tagging the assailant), then the assailant is "out", and must leave the court. If an assailant crosses all nine trenches, they may say the word "Tond", which compels the defenders to turn around, allowing the assailant to now attempt to re-cross the nine trenches in the opposite direction. If an assailant manages to cross all nine trenches in both directions, a "Lona" is said to have been scored, meaning that 18 points have been scored by the attacking team for the 18 times that assailant crossed a trench; after a Lona has been scored, the not-out assailants are brought back to the starting area and then allowed to continue scoring for the remainder of the inning.

Grenadier or sur 
The defender in the front trench is known as a "grenadier" or "sur", and is able to run in either the front trench or the central trench. At the start of the inning, or after a Lona has been scored, the grenadier must "cut the squares" before tagging any assailants, meaning that the grenadier must run from the square which is formed by the intersection of the front trench and the central trench to the square formed by the intersection of the next trench and the central trench, and then back to the first square.

Rings 
Special rules apply when two or more assailants are encircled by a regular defender and a grenadier, which is known as a "ring".

2013 National Championship
The national level Atya Patya tournament for 2013 was held at Bhatkal in Karnataka. Represented by 22 states & Union Territories, the event was organized jointly by Karnataka Atya Patya association Davangere and Bhatkal Atya Patya association.

Controversy
The president of Puducherry Atya patya Association, Selvan refuted accusations levelled by Anbhagan, Member of Legislative Assembly, Puducherry, that  Atya patya certificates were issued to take benefit of quota available to sports persons, in seats at medical colleges. He stated that the sport was registered in 22 states of India including in Tamil Nadu. The Orissa High Court, in 1997 observed that; "The clear and categorical case of the petitioner is that she having represented the Orissa State team is the VIth National (Senior) Atya Patya Championship held in New Delhi from 22nd to 24th July, 1994 which is a recognised national event is entitled to be admitted in the 1st year Diploma in Engineering under Sports quota." giving relief to a petitioner who was denied admission under sports quota.

See also 

 Patintero, a highly similar game in the Philippines
 Surr
 Kho kho

References

Traditional sports of India
Sports originating in India
Tag variants